Julius Watkins Sextet is an album by horn player Julius Watkins featuring tracks recorded in 1954 and 1955 which were originally released as two 10 inch LPs (BLP 5053, 5064) on the Blue Note label.

Reception
Allmusic awarded the album 4½ stars stating: "The French horn might be a difficult instrument, but Watkins played it with the warmth of a trombone and nearly the fluidity of a trumpet. All nine straight-ahead selections on his CD are group originals, with Duke Jordan's future standard "Jordu" being heard in one of its earliest versions. Overall, the music fits into the modern mainstream of the period. This early effort by Julius Watkins is easily recommended".

Track listing
All compositions by Julius Watkins except where noted.
 "Linda Delia" (George Butcher) - 5:18	
 "Perpetuation" - 5:06
 "I Have Known" - 4:25
 "Leete" - 4:50
 "Garden Delights" - 4:43
 "Julie Ann" - 3:32
 "Sparkling Burgundy" - 4:15
 "B and B" - 4:57
 "Jordu" (Duke Jordan) - 4:44

Personnel
Julius Watkins - French horn
Frank Foster (tracks 1-4), Hank Mobley (tracks 5-9) - tenor saxophone
George Butcher (tracks 1-4), Duke Jordan (tracks 5-9) - piano 
Perry Lopez - guitar
Oscar Pettiford - bass
Art Blakey (tracks 5-9), Kenny Clarke (tracks 1-4) - drums

References

Blue Note Records albums
Julius Watkins albums
1995 albums
Albums produced by Alfred Lion
Albums recorded at Van Gelder Studio